This is a list of institutions of higher education in Punjab.

Autonomous institutions

Institutes of National Importance
Indian Institute of Management Amritsar
Indian Institute of Technology Ropar
Indian Institute of Science Education and Research, Mohali Punjab
Dr. B. R. Ambedkar National Institute of Technology Jalandhar
All India Institute of Medical Sciences, Bathinda

Central Government Institutions
Institute of Nano Science and Technology
Central University of Punjab, Bathinda

State Government Institutions

Baba Farid University of Health Sciences, Faridkot
Guru Angad Dev Veterinary and Animal Sciences University, Ludhiana
Guru Nanak Dev University, Amritsar
Guru Ravidas Ayurved University, Hoshiarpur
IK Gujral Punjab Technical University, Jalandhar
 Jagat Guru Nanak Dev Punjab State Open University, Patiala
Maharaja Ranjit Singh State Technical University, Bathinda
Panjab University, Chandigarh
Punjab Agricultural University, Ludhiana
Punjabi University, Patiala
Punjab Sports University, Patiala
Punjabi University Guru Kashi Campus, Talwandi Sabo
 Rajiv Gandhi National University of Law, Patiala
 Sardar Beant Singh State University, Gurdaspur
 Shaheed Bhagat Singh State University, Firozpur
 Sri Guru Teg Bahadur State University of Law, Tarn Taran district

Deemed 
Sant Longowal Institute of Engineering and Technology
Thapar University, Patiala

Private 

Adesh University, Bathinda
Akal University, Bathinda
CT University, Ludhiana
Chandigarh University, Mohali
Chitkara University, Punjab, Rajpura
DAV University, Jalandhar
Desh Bhagat University, Mandi Gobindgarh
GNA University, Phagwara
Guru Kashi University, Talwandi Sabo
Indian School of Business, Ajitgarh
Lovely Professional University, Phagwara
Rayat Bahra University, Mohali
RIMT University, Mandi Gobindgarh
Sant Baba Bhag Singh University, Jalandhar
Sri Guru Granth Sahib World University, Fatehgarh Sahib

Autonomous colleges in Punjab

Autonomous Degree Colleges
Kanya Maha Vidyalaya (KMV), Jalandhar 
Khalsa College, Amritsar

Engineering Colleges

Guru Nanak Dev Engineering College, Ludhiana

Medical colleges
 Adesh Institute of Medical Sciences & Research, Bathinda
 Christian Medical College, Ludhiana
 Government Medical College, Amritsar
 Government Medical College, Patiala
 Guru Gobind Singh Medical College, Faridkot	
 Punjab Institute of Medical Sciences, Jalandhar
All India Institutes of Medical Sciences (AIIMS), Bathinda

Reputed colleges (technical / professional)

Baba Banda Singh Bahadur Engineering College, Fatehgarh Sahib
Baba Hira Singh Bhattal Institute of Engineering and Technology (Government Engineering College), Lehragaga
Baring Union Christian College, Batala
Beant College of Engineering and Technology Gurdaspur
Bhutta College of Engineering & Technology, Ludhiana
Giani Zail Singh Campus College of Engineering & Technology (Government Engineering College), Bathinda 
Guru Nanak Dev Engineering College, Ludhiana
Indo Global Colleges, Abhipur
Khalsa College, Amritsar
Malwa College of Nursing, Kotkapura
Ramgarhia Institute of Engineering and Technology. Phagwara
Shaheed Bhagat Singh State Technical Campus, Ferozepur
Yadavindra College of Engineering, Punjabi University Guru Kashi Campus, Talwandi Sabo

Other reputed institutions

 BBK DAV College for Women, Amritsar
 College of Engineering and Management, Kapurthala
 Guru Nanak College, Budhlada
 Mohindra College, Patiala 
 Panjab University Swami Sarvanand Giri Regional Centre, Hoshiarpur
 PCTE Group of Institutes (including Punjab College of Technical Education), Ludhiana
 PEC University of Technology, Chandigarh×
 D.A.V. College, Jalandhar

District-Wise Colleges in Punjab

Amritsar
BBK DAV College for Women, Amritsar
Guru Nanak Dev University
Khalsa College, Amritsar
Khalsa College of Law, Amritsar
Sri Guru Ram Das University of Health Sciences, Sri Amritsar

Bathinda
Adesh Institute of Medical Sciences & Research
Bathinda College of Law
Central University of Punjab
DAV College
Giani Zail Singh Campus College of Engineering & Technology
Government Rajindra College
Guru Kashi University
Yadavindra College of Engineering, Punjabi University Guru Kashi Campus, Talwandi Sabo

Faridkot
Baba Farid Law College
Baba Farid University of Health Sciences
Malwa College of Nursing

Fatehgarh Sahib
Baba Banda Singh Bahadur Engineering College
Desh Bhagat University
Mata Gujri College 
Sri Guru Granth Sahib World University
RIMT University, Mandi Gobindgarh

Fazilka
DAV College, Abohar

Hoshiarpur
Guru Ravidas Ayurved University
Panjab University Swami Sarvanand Giri Regional Centre, Hoshiarpur

Jalandhar
DAV University
Doaba College
Dr. B. R. Ambedkar National Institute of Technology Jalandhar
Hans Raj Mahila Maha Vidyalaya
Lovely Professional University
Sant Baba Bhag Singh University
D.A.V. College, Jalandhar
Punjab Institute of Medical Sciences

Kapurthala
I. K. Gujral Punjab Technical University

Ludhiana
CT University, Ludhiana
 Christian Medical College, Ludhiana
Dayanand Medical College
Guru Angad Dev Veterinary and Animal Sciences University
Guru Nanak Dev Engineering College, Ludhiana
Punjab Agricultural University

Mansa
Guru Nanak College, Budhlada

Moga
Baba Kundan Singh Memorial Law College

Mohali
Chandigarh University
Panjab University
IISER Mohali
Institute of Nano Science and Technology
Punjab College of Engineering and Technology
Universal Law College

Patiala
Government Medical College, Patiala
Government Mohindra College
Multani Mal Modi College
Netaji Subhas National Institute of Sports
Govt. Physical Education College 
Punjabi University
Rajiv Gandhi National University of Law
Thapar University
Bikram college vof commerce

Sahibazada Ajit Singh Nagar
Guru Gobind Singh College of Modern Technology

Sangrur
Bhai Gurdas College of Law
Bhai Gurdas Institute of Engineering & Technology

See also
List of colleges and institutes affiliated with Technical Universities of Punjab (India)

References 

Punjab
Education